Nathan Setor Nyafli (born 6 February 1993) is an English retired footballer who played for Gillingham as a forward.

Career
Nyafli began his career with Milton Keynes Dons, and was with the Dons for a year before moving to Gillingham. Whilst doing his apprenticeship Nyafli joined Whitstable Town on loan where he made one appearance for the club. The following season he joined Merstham, Ramsgate and Eastbourne Borough on loan. He was named among the substitutes for the final game of Gillingham's 2012–13 season against Burton Albion, and after replacing Kane Haysman, he converted Sam Muggleton's long throw to score his first senior goal for the club with his very first touch. He did not feature for the first team in the 2013–14 season, however, due to an ongoing hip problem, which proved too severe for the forward to continue playing, and his retirement from professional football was announced on 4 February 2014.

References

External links

Profile at Aylesbury United

1993 births
Living people
Footballers from Lambeth
English footballers
English sportspeople of Ghanaian descent
Association football defenders
Gillingham F.C. players
Whitstable Town F.C. players
Merstham F.C. players
Ramsgate F.C. players
Eastbourne Borough F.C. players
English Football League players
National League (English football) players